Challenger's Alliance, also known as Challenger Union (Chinese: 挑战者联盟), is a Chinese variety show airing on September 21 of 2015. In season 1, the show featured an all-star cast of Fan Bingbing, Li Chen, Wu Yifan, Lin Gengxin, Dong Chengpeng, and Chen Handian. Every episode, the cast will spend a day performing a job and finishing a specified task while doing it, if they accomplish the task, they gain a win, if they do not, they fail.

Cast

Episodes 
All episodes feature the cast performing a job and finishing a task while doing it.

Guests

Reception

References 

Chinese variety television shows